Max Gerbier (born 1951) is a Haitian painter. Born in Milot near Cap-Haïtien in northern Haiti, Gerbier typically paints landscapes of the area surrounding his hometown. His paintings have been exhibited in France and the United States.

References
 

1951 births
Haitian painters
Haitian male painters
Living people
Date of birth missing (living people)